Kwail County is a kun, or county, in South Hwanghae province, North Korea.  It faces the Yellow Sea to the west.

The economy of the county is based on the production of fruit. Kwail County was created in 1967 from part of Songhwa County, with the intention of making the entire cultivated area of the county into "100 li of blooming orchards".  The name Kwail is a Korean word meaning "fruit," and doesn't correspond to any Chinese characters.  This makes Kwail County one of the few counties in Korea whose name cannot be written in hanja; for another such county, see Saebyŏl. Marshal Kim Jong Un visited Kwail county in September 2017.

Geography
44% of the land is forest land.

Administrative divisions
Kwail county is divided into 1 ŭp (town) and 24 ri (villages):

Transportation
Kwail county is served by the Ŭllyul Line of the Korean State Railway.

See also
Geography of North Korea
Administrative divisions of North Korea
South Hwanghae

References

Counties of South Hwanghae